Gerjen is a village in Tolna County, Hungary.

Sport
The association football club, Gerjeni SK, is based in the town.

External links 
 Street map 

Populated places in Tolna County